The 1925 Tasmanian state election was held on Wednesday, 3 June 1925 in the Australian state of Tasmania to elect 30 members of the Tasmanian House of Assembly. The election used the Hare-Clark proportional representation system — six members were elected from each of five electorates.

The ambiguous result of the 1922 election saw the formation of a coalition government of the Nationalist and Country parties, with John Hayes as Premier of Tasmania. Hayes and his ministry lasted only until August 1923. Tasmania had borrowed heavily during World War I, and was in a poor financial state. Calls for Hayes to resign began in mid-1923, and he did so after a meeting of dissident MHAs undermined his support. James Newton was elected Nationalist leader, but failed to achieve the required support. Walter Lee was voted leader, and became the next Premier in October 1923; and Hayes was appointed to the Australian Senate.

Lee's ministry lasted only 10 weeks and in October 1923, a small group of Nationalists revolted against Lee, and pledged support for Joseph Lyons and the opposition Labor Party. Lyons was sworn in as Premier, and was the incumbent Premier at the 1925 election. Labor won the 1925 election in a landslide – Lyons' economic improvements and diplomacy with the Nationalists made him a popular Premier.

Results

|}

Distribution of votes

Primary vote by division

Distribution of seats

See also
 Members of the Tasmanian House of Assembly, 1925–1928
 Candidates of the 1925 Tasmanian state election

References

External links
Assembly Election Results, 1925, Parliament of Tasmania.
Report on General Election, 1925, Tasmanian Electoral Commission, 8 December 1925.

Elections in Tasmania
1925 elections in Australia
1920s in Tasmania
June 1925 events